Jacques Baril (born February 6, 1942) was a Canadian politician, cabinet minister and a five-term Member of the National Assembly of Quebec.

Early life
Jacques Baril was born in the town of Princeville, Quebec in 1942. He was educated at l'École Sacré-Cœur de Princeville before working as a mechanic at a local garage. In 1966, he began working as a dairy farmer. It was his work as a farmer that opened the door to his political activities. Baril became the director of the Union of Agricultural Producers of Quebec in 1974. He was also the founder of the local beef cooperative in the Arthabaska region.

Later he would shift his work toward municipal politics, becoming a municipal councilor in Princeville and organizing locally for the Parti Québécois.

Member of the National Assembly
Baril was elected in the 1976 election, in which the Parti Québécois formed the government for the first time. He was handily reelected four year later in the 1981 election. During his second term in office, Baril served as Deputy Whip for the PQ, as well as Parliamentary Assistant for the Minister of Agriculture.

Baril briefly retired in 1985, during which time he served as Mayor of Princeville from 1987 to 1989 and a member of the executive committee for the L'Érable Regional County Municipality. It was also reported that he left provincial politics in protest of Pierre-Marc Johnson's "National Affirmation" policy.

He returned to politics in the 1989 election, being re-elected in the 1994 and 1998 elections. During the 36th Quebec Legislature, Baril served in Cabinet, serving as Minister of Transport. In 2003, Baril announced he would retire from political life.

References

1942 births
Living people
People from Centre-du-Québec
Parti Québécois MNAs
21st-century Canadian politicians